Pedro Pastor was a Cuban pitcher in the Negro leagues in the 1920s.

Pastor played for the Cuban Stars (West) and the Detroit Stars in 1924. In three recorded appearances on the mound, he posted a 4.08 ERA over 17.2 innings.

References

External links
 and Seamheads

1894 births
Date of birth missing
Year of death missing
Place of death missing
Cuban Stars (West) players
Detroit Stars players
Baseball pitchers
Baseball players from Havana
Cuban expatriate baseball players in the United States